The Curlers Corner Autumn Gold Curling Classic is an annual women's World Curling Tour event held at the Calgary Curling Club in Calgary, Alberta. It was the first Grand Slam event of the season from 2006 to 2014, but is no longer considered one of the official Grand Slams.

The first Autumn Gold Classic was held in 1978, and at the time only had a total purse of $10,500, with the winning team receiving $4,000. At the time, it had the largest purse for a women's curling tournament in Canada. Its main sponsor in 1978 was JoAnne's Fashions.

The event began seeing international teams in 1987, thanks in part to the sport being added as a demonstration event at the 1988 Winter Olympics.

The 1996 and 2000 events were qualifiers for the 1997 and 2001 Canadian Olympic Curling Trials respectively.

The 2001 event was the first televised tournament on the Women's World Curling Tour, with the semifinals and finals shown on WTSN.

Between 2004 and 2018, the total prize money given out has been in excess of $50,000. In 2019, the purse was $44,000, with the winning team receiving $12,000.

The 2010 Classic saw the first non-Canadian team to win a Grand Slam of Curling event, the Wang Bingyu rink from China.

Sponsors
JoAnne's Fashions (1978–1980)
Labatt (1985–1990)
Husky Oil (1991–2002)
Trail Appliances (2003–2009)
Curlers Corner (2010–present)

Past champions
Past champions are as follows:

References

External links

 
Former Grand Slam (curling) events
Curling competitions in Calgary
1978 establishments in Alberta
Annual sporting events in Canada
Recurring sporting events established in 1978